Huarong County is a county in Hunan province, South Central part of  China, it is under the administration of Yueyang City.

The county is located on the northeastern margin of the province, on the southern bank of the Yangtze River and on the northern bank of the Dongting Lake. Huarong County is bordered to the east and the southeast by Junshan District, to the southwest by Nanxian and Anxiang Counties, to the north by Shishou City of Hubei, to the northeast by Jianli County of Hubei.

The county has 12 towns and 2 townships under its jurisdiction. The government seat is Zhanghua Town.

Administrative divisions
According to the result on adjustment of township-level administrative divisions of Huarong county on November 20, 2015, Huarong has 12 towns and ２ townships under its jurisdiction. they are:

2 townships
Tuanzhou
Xinhe, Huarong

12 towns	
Beijinggang
Caojun
Chaqi
Dongshan, Huarong
Meitianhu
Nianyuxu
Sanfengsi
Wanyu, Huarong
Yushan, Huarong
Zhanghua Town
Zhihedu
Zhuzikou

Climate

References

 
County-level divisions of Hunan
Yueyang